Armstrong is an unincorporated community in Freeborn County, in the U.S. state of Minnesota.

History
Armstrong was laid out in 1878, and named for Thomas H. Armstrong, a Minnesota politician who had the local grain elevator built. A post office was established at Armstrong in 1878, and remained in operation until it was discontinued in 1957.

References

Unincorporated communities in Freeborn County, Minnesota
Unincorporated communities in Minnesota